Hot Fuss is the debut studio album by American rock band the Killers, released on June 7, 2004, in the United Kingdom and on June 15, 2004, in the United States by Island Records. The album is mostly influenced by new wave music and post-punk. Hot Fuss spawned four commercially and critically successful singles: "Mr. Brightside", "Somebody Told Me", "All These Things That I've Done" and "Smile Like You Mean It".

The album reached number seven on the Billboard 200 and number one on the UK Albums Chart. , Hot Fuss had sold more than seven million copies worldwide, including more than three million in the United States and more than two million in the United Kingdom. It has also been certified platinum or multi-platinum in Australia, Canada, Ireland, and New Zealand. The album and its first three singles went on to garner five Grammy Award nominations.

Background
The album was recorded at various points throughout 2003 with Jeff Saltzman in Berkeley, California, with the exception of "Everything Will Be Alright", which was recorded by Corlene Byrd in guitarist Dave Keuning's apartment. Many of the tracks were originally recorded as demos, which the band decided to keep for their spontaneity. The album was mixed by Mark Needham at Cornerstone Studios in Los Angeles and Alan Moulder at Eden Studios in London. In 2012, Brandon Flowers told NME that he felt "depressed" after hearing the Strokes' album Is This It. "That record just sounded so perfect", he said. "We threw away everything [we were working on] and the only song that made the cut and remained was 'Mr. Brightside.'"

The songs "Midnight Show" and "Jenny Was a Friend of Mine" are two parts of the so-called "Murder Trilogy", detailing the fictional story of a woman who is murdered by her jealous boyfriend. The first part, "Leave the Bourbon on the Shelf", appears on the band's B-sides and rarities compilation, Sawdust.

Production
The album heavily features a vocal effect called Echo Farm on Flowers' voice. In 2014, Needham recounted, "There were three of us involved in the production company on that record: Braden Merrick, Jeff Saltzman and myself. Jeff and I had been partners for a few years. He was an entertainment attorney and was shopping stuff, but he actually really wanted to be a producer as well. We set Jeff up with a studio, got him started in recording and since he’s a smart guy, he picked it up really quick. At that time, Echo Farm had just come out, and that was really the only vocal effect he had. If you open up Echo Farm, the first setting that comes up is the default setting, which overdrives the vocal a bit and sets an 84 ms delay. That was basically what he put on everything and it sort of became the default vocal tone on the whole record, plus it worked really great, so we kept it. It changes a little bit on certain things, but it was a fairly consistent effect through the whole record."

Artwork
The album cover was photographed by Matthias Clamer in 2000, in the southern region of the suburbs of Beijing, China. The characters on top of each building ("建", "材", "开", and "发") translate to "construction material development".

Release and reception

Hot Fuss received generally positive reviews from critics. On Metacritic, the album has a weighted average score of 66 out of 100 based on 20 reviews, indicating "generally favorable reviews".

Hot Fuss was released on June 7, 2004, in the United Kingdom and on June 15, 2004, in the United States. In 2005, it was reissued as a box of eleven seven-inch vinyl discs, with an album track on each A-side and non-album tracks on the B-sides. The album reached number seven on the US Billboard 200. It was certified triple platinum by the Recording Industry Association of America (RIAA) on December 1, 2005, and as of January 2017, it had sold 3.75 million copies in the United States.

Hot Fuss topped the UK Albums Chart for two consecutive weeks in January 2005. It was the 26th best-selling album of the 2000s decade in the United Kingdom, and is listed among the top 40 longest-charting albums in the history of the UK Albums Chart, with 254 weeks. On July 22, 2013, the British Phonographic Industry (BPI) certified the album seven-times platinum; by August 2020, it had sold 2,335,495 copies in the UK. In 2022 the album was named as the 20th most successful debut album in UK chart history. The album has also been certified platinum or multi-platinum in Australia, Canada, Ireland, and New Zealand. Hot Fuss had sold over than seven million copies worldwide as of December 2012.

Rolling Stone ranked Hot Fuss 43rd on its list of the "100 Best Albums of the Decade", and it was, at one point, listed among the 1001 Albums You Must Hear Before You Die. Gigwise readers voted it the number-one "Best Debut Album of All Time" in 2013. Rolling Stone ranked Hot Fuss the 33rd of its list of "The 100 Greatest Debut Albums of All Time".

The album has inspired numerous cover recordings, including Meg Washington's 2022 cover album of the same name.

Accolades

Hot Fuss is listed among the 1001 Albums You Must Hear Before You Die.

Track listing
All tracks are produced by Jeff Saltzman and the Killers, except "Everything Will Be Alright", produced by Brandon Flowers.

Personnel
Credits adapted from the liner notes of Hot Fuss.

The Killers
 Brandon Flowers – vocals, synthesizer
 Dave Keuning – guitar
 Mark Stoermer – bass
 Ronnie Vannucci Jr. – drums

Additional musicians
 Sweet Inspirations – gospel choir

Technical

 Jeff Saltzman – production, recording 
 The Killers – production 
 Brandon Flowers – production 
 Corlene Byrd – recording 
 Dave Stedronsky – engineering assistance
 Mark Needham – engineering assistance ; mixing 
 Will Brierre – engineering assistance
 Dario Dendi – engineering assistance
 Alan Moulder – mixing 
 Brian "Big Bass" Gardner – mastering

Artwork
 Louis Marino – art direction
 Seth Goldfarb – cover photo
 Matt Hartman – band photography

Charts

Weekly charts

Year-end charts

Decade-end charts

Century-end charts (running)

Certifications

Release history

Notes

References

2004 debut albums
Island Records albums
The Killers albums
Vertigo Records albums